The Entre Brenne et Montmorillonnais is a professional one day cycling race held annually in France. It is part of UCI Europe Tour in category 1.2.

Winners

References

Cycle races in France
UCI Europe Tour races